Cardiff University is a public research university in Cardiff, Wales, United Kingdom. It was established in 1883 as the University College of South Wales and Monmouthshire and became a founding college of the University of Wales in 1893. It merged with the University of Wales Institute of Science and Technology (UWIST) in 1988 as the University of Wales College, Cardiff (University of Wales, Cardiff, from 1996). In 1997 it received degree-awarding powers, but held them in abeyance. It adopted the operating name of Cardiff University in 1999; this became its legal name in 2005, when it became an independent university awarding its own degrees.

Cardiff University is the only Welsh member of the Russell Group of research-intensive British universities. Academics and alumni of the university have included three heads of state or government, two Nobel laureates, 15 fellows of the Royal Society, 11 fellows of the Royal Academy of Engineering, seven fellows of the British Academy, 21 fellows of the Academy of Medical Sciences and 34 fellows of the Academy of Social Sciences.

History

University College

Discussions on the founding of a university college in South Wales began in 1879, when a group of Welsh and English MPs urged the government to consider the poor provision of higher and intermediate education in Wales and "the best means of assisting any local effort which may be made for supplying such deficiency."

In October 1881, William Ewart Gladstone's government appointed a departmental committee to conduct "an enquiry into the nature and extent of intermediate and higher education in Wales", chaired by Lord Aberdare and consisting of Viscount Emlyn, Reverend Prebendary H. G. Robinson, Henry Richard, John Rhys and Lewis Morris. The Aberdare Report, as it came to be known, took evidence from a wide range of sources and over 250 witnesses and recommended a college each for North Wales and South Wales, the latter to be located in Glamorgan and the former to be the established University College of Wales in Aberystwyth (now Aberystwyth University). The committee cited the unique Welsh national identity and noted that many students in Wales could not afford to travel to University in England or Scotland. It advocated a national degree-awarding university for Wales, composed of regional colleges, which should be non-sectarian in nature and exclude the teaching of theology.

After the recommendation was published, Cardiff Corporation sought to secure the location of the college in Cardiff, and on 12 December 1881 formed a University College Committee to aid the matter. There was competition to be the site between Swansea and Cardiff. On 12 March 1883, after arbitration, a decision was made in Cardiff's favour. This was strengthened by the need to consider the interests of Monmouthshire, at that time not legally incorporated into Wales, and the greater sum received by Cardiff in support of the college, through a public appeal that raised £37,000 and a number of private donations, notably from the Lord Bute and Lord Windsor. In April Lord Aberdare was appointed as the college's first president. The possible locations considered included Cardiff Arms Park, Cathedral Road, and Moira Terrace, Roath, before the site of the Old Royal Infirmary buildings on Newport Road was chosen.

The University College of South Wales and Monmouthshire opened on 24 October 1883 with courses in Biology, Chemistry, English, French, German, Greek, History, Latin, Mathematics and Astronomy, Music, Welsh, Logic and Philosophy, and Physics. It was incorporated by Royal Charter the following year, this being the first in Wales to allow the enrolment of women, and specifically forbidding religious tests for entry. John Viriamu Jones was appointed as the university's first principal at the age of 27. As Cardiff was not an independent university and could not award its own degrees, it prepared its students for examinations of the University of London or for further study at Oxford or Cambridge.

In 1888 the University College at Cardiff and that of North Wales (now Bangor University) proposed to the University College Wales at Aberystwyth joint action to gain a university charter for Wales, modelled on that of Victoria University, a confederation of new universities in Northern England. Such a charter was granted to the new University of Wales in 1893, allowing the colleges to award degrees as members. The Chancellor was set ex officio as the Prince of Wales, and the position of operational head would rotate among heads of the colleges.

In 1885, Aberdare Hall opened as the first hall of residence, allowing women access to the university. This moved to its current site in 1895, but remains a single-sex hall. In 1904 came the appointment of the first female associate professor in the UK, Millicent Mackenzie, who in 1910 became the first female full professor at a fully chartered UK university.

In 1901 Principal Jones persuaded Cardiff Corporation to give the college a five-acre site in Cathays Park (instead of selling it as they would have done otherwise). Soon after, in 1905, work on a new building commenced under the architect W. D. Caröe. Money ran short for the project, however. Although the side-wings were completed in the 1960s, the planned Great Hall has never been built. Caroe sought to combine the charm and elegance of his former (Trinity College, Cambridge) with the picturesque balance of many Oxford colleges. On 14 October 1909 the "New College" building in Cathays Park (now Main Building) was opened in a ceremony involving a procession from the "Old College" in Newport Road.

In 1931, the School of Medicine, founded as part of the college in 1893 along with the Departments of Anatomy, Physiology, Pathology, Pharmacology, was split off to form the Welsh National School of Medicine, which was renamed in 1984 the University of Wales College of Medicine.

In 1972, the institution was renamed University College Cardiff.

1988 merger
In 1988, University College Cardiff underwent financial difficulties, and a declaration of insolvency was considered. This led to a merger with the University of Wales Institute of Science and Technology (UWIST), to form the University of Wales College of Cardiff. The Principal of the new institution was Sir Aubrey Trotman-Dickenson, who had been the principal of UWIST. After changes to the constitution in 1996, its name was changed to the University of Wales, Cardiff.

In the early 1990s, the university's computer systems served as the home for The Internet Movie Database.

Independence and 2004 merger

In 1997, the college was granted full independent degree-awarding powers by the Privy Council, though, as a member of the University of Wales it could not begin using them, and in 1999 the public name of the university was changed to Cardiff University.

In 2002, ideas were floated to merge Cardiff again with the University of Wales College of Medicine, after publication of the Welsh Assembly Government's review of higher education in Wales. This merger became effective on 1 August 2004, when Cardiff University ceased to be a constituent of the University of Wales and became an independent "link institution" affiliated to the federal university. The process of the merger was completed on 1 December 2004, when the Act of Parliament transferring UWCM's assets to Cardiff University received Royal Assent. On 17 December it was announced that the Privy Council had given approval to the new Supplemental Charter and had granted university status to Cardiff, legally changing the name of the institution to Cardiff University. Cardiff awarded University of Wales degrees to students admitted before 2005, but these have been replaced by Cardiff degrees.

In 2005, Wales College of Medicine, as part of the university, launched the North Wales Clinical School in Wrexham, in collaboration with the North East Wales Institute of Higher Education in Wrexham, the University of Wales, Bangor, and the National Health Service in Wales. This received funds of £12.5 million from the Welsh Assembly and trebled the number of trainee doctors in clinical training in Wales over a four-year period.

The university also has a popular Centre for Lifelong Learning, which has been teaching a wide range of courses for over 125 years. However, in July 2009, the university announced it was ending over 250 humanities courses at the centre, making over 100 staff redundant. The university has since reintroduced a number of humanities courses for a trial period beginning in 2010.

In June 2010, the university launched three new research institutes, each offering a new approach to a major modern research issue. The Neurosciences and Mental Health Research Institute and the Cancer Stem Cell Research Institute are housed in the purpose-built Hadyn Ellis Building, and in the Sustainable Places Research Institute. Another part of the Science and Development Campus, the Cardiff University Brain Research Imaging Centre (CUBRIC), opened in June 2016 for neuroimaging research.

Vice chancellors and principals

List of Vice-Chancellors and Principals of Cardiff University and its predecessors (shown in brackets):

1883–1901 (University College of South Wales and Monmouthshire): John Viriamu Jones
1901–1918 (University College of South Wales and Monmouthshire): Ernest Howard Griffiths
1918–1929 (University College of South Wales and Monmouthshire): A.H. Trow
1929–1949 (University College of South Wales and Monmouthshire): Frederick Rees
1949–1966 (University College of South Wales and Monmouthshire): Anthony Steel
1966–1972 (University College of South Wales and Monmouthshire): C. W. L. Bevan
1972–1987 (University College Cardiff): C. W. L. Bevan
1968–1988 (University of Wales Institute of Science and Technology): Sir Aubrey Trotman-Dickenson
1988–1993: Aubrey Trotman-Dickenson
1993–2001: Brian Smith
2001–2012: David Grant
2012–present: Colin Riordan

Campus

Academic facilities

The university's academic facilities are centred around Cathays Park in central Cardiff, which contains the university's grade II* listed main building, housing administrative facilities and the science library, previously called the Drapers' library; the grade II listed Bute building, which contains the Welsh School of Architecture, the grade I listed Glamorgan building, which houses the Cardiff Schools of Planning and Geography and Social Sciences, the Redwood Building (named in 1979 after the Redwood Family of Boverton near Llantwit Major by a 1978 suggestion by J. D. R. Thomas), which houses the School of Pharmacy and Pharmaceutical Sciences; the law building which houses the Cardiff Law School; and the biosciences building, which provides facilities for both biosciences and medical teaching. The School of Engineering, School of Computer Science and Informatics and School of Physics and Astronomy are located in the Queen's Buildings, off Newport Road, and the School of Journalism, Media and Culture at 2 Central Square.

A number of university academic facilities are located at the Heath Park campus, based at the University Hospital of Wales. This covers the Cardiff University School of Medicine, the School of Dentistry, the School of Healthcare Sciences, and the School of Optometry and Vision Sciences.

Athletics facilities
Most of the university's sports facilities are located at the sports training village in the Talybont Halls complex. This includes facilities for football, badminton, basketball, tennis, hockey and gym. Additional gym facilities and squash courts are located at the university fitness and squash centre, near the city centre campus at Cathays Park. Extensive playing fields for Rugby, football and lacrosse are located at the university playing fields near Llanrumney. The university also utilises the nearby Millennium Stadium for rugby fixtures such as the annual varsity tournament.

Organisation

Schools and colleges
The 26 academic schools of the university are divided into three colleges: Arts, Humanities and Social Sciences; Biomedical and Life Sciences; and Physical Sciences.

College of Arts, Humanities and Social Sciences

Business
English, Communication and Philosophy
Geography and Planning
History Archaeology and Religion 
Journalism, Media and Cultural Studies
Law and Politics
Modern Languages
Music
Social Sciences
Welsh

College of Biomedical and Life Sciences
Biosciences
Dentistry
Healthcare Sciences
Medicine
Optometry and Vision Sciences
Pharmacy and Pharmaceutical Sciences
Postgraduate Medical and Dental Education (Wales Deanery)
Psychology

College of Physical Sciences and Engineering
Architecture
Chemistry
Computer Science & Informatics
Earth and Environmental Sciences
Engineering
Mathematics
Physics and Astronomy

Cardiff also has a Doctoral Academy, that brings together the work of four previous discipline-based Graduate Schools and the postgraduate research activity of the university's Graduate Centre.

Finances
In the financial year ended 31 July 2022, the annual income of the institution was £631.6 million (£634.2 million for the group). The operating expenditure was £604.2 million (£606.5 million for the group), with a pensions provision of £118.8 million for a total expenditure of £725.3 million. The consolidated group income and expenditure includes University College Cardiff Consultants Limited and International Learning Exchange Programme Limited, but does not include the University Students’ Union or the Cardiff Partnership Fund Limited as Cardiff University's council does not control the financial and operating activities of those bodies.

Key sources of income included £125.4 million from research grants and contracts, £98.9 million from Funding Council grants and £323.5 million from tuition fees and support grants. As of 31 July 2022, Cardiff had endowments of £45.6 million and total reserves of £648.7 million.

Academic profile

Rankings and reputation

Cardiff has two Nobel Laureates on its staff, Sir Martin Evans and Robert Huber. A number of Cardiff University staff have been elected as Fellows of the Royal Society, these include Graham Hutchings FRS, professor of Physical Chemistry and Director of the Cardiff Catalysis Institute, School of Chemistry, Ole Holger Petersen, MRC Professor and Director of Cardiff School of Biosciences. and John M. Pearce, Professor of Psychology.

In 2013, Cardiff University was ranked as one of the best UK universities for supporting LGBT students, by the charity Stonewall in its annual Gay by Degree guide. The university was one of only two in the UK and the only one in Wales to achieve top marks in a Stonewall checklist of priorities for LGBT+ students.

Cardiff University was ranked joint 168th in Best Global Universities by US News in 2021. It was ranked 164th among universities around the world by SCImago Institutions Rankings in 2021. The Round University Rankings ranked Cardiff University 162nd globally in 2021. The Center for World University Rankings listed Cardiff University 159th in the world in 2021.

According to QS World University Rankings by Subject in 2021, Cardiff University ranked within the world's top 50 universities in communication and media studies (28), and in architecture and built environment (37). Other subjects ranked within the top 100 are dentistry, and mineral and mining engineering (49) civil and structural engineering, geography, social policy and administration, pharmacy and pharmacology, English language and literature, psychology, and sociology.

Admissions

In terms of average UCAS points of entrants, Cardiff ranked 26th in Britain in 2018. The university gave offers of admission to 75.2 per cent of its applicants in 2015, the 13th lowest amongst the Russell Group.

According to the 2017 Times and Sunday Times Good University Guide, approximately 15 per cent of Cardiff's undergraduates come from independent schools. In the 2016–2017 academic year, the university had a domicile breakdown of 76:5:19 of UK:EU:non-EU students respectively with a female to male ratio of 59:41.

Student life

Student accommodation
The university maintains 15 student halls and a number of student houses throughout the city of Cardiff; providing a total of 5,362 student places in accommodation. They are in a variety of architectural styles and ages, from the Gothic Aberdare Hall, built in 1895, to the modern Talybont Gate Building, completed in 2014. All first-year students are guaranteed a place in university owned and managed halls. The Cardiff University Halls are:

Aberconway Hall
Aberdare Hall
Cartwright Court
Clodien House
Colum Hall
Hodge Hall
Gordon Hall
Roy Jenkins Hall
Senghennydd Court
Senghennydd Hall
The Talybont 'Student Village' (Including Talybont North, South, Court and Gate Halls)
University Hall 
Houses in Colum Road and Colum Place
Student Village Houses

Students' Union

The Cardiff University Students' Union is a student-run organisation aiming to promote student interests within the university and further afield. The Cardiff University Students' Union building is near Cathays Park, next to Cathays railway station. It has shops, a night club and the studios of Xpress Radio and Gair Rhydd, the student newspaper. It is democratically controlled by the student body through the election of seven full-time officers, who manage the running of the Union. The Union provides a range of services, including a number of cafes, bars and shops, as well as advice, training and representation. The Union is an affiliated member of the National Union of Students.

Groups and societies
The Union also supports over 260 other clubs and societies across a wide range of interests, including: Cardiff University Debating Society, and Act One, the student dramatic society. All clubs offer opportunities for beginners and the more experienced students.

Media

The Union provides facilities and support for several student media groups, including: Gair Rhydd, an award-winning, free student newspaper that is released every Monday of term; Quench, a monthly arts and lifestyle magazine that specialises in the local music scene as well as original investigative feature articles; and CUTV, the student television channel.

Xpress Radio is the student radio station. It broadcasts daily during term from studios in the Students' Union building, with programming such as comedy panel shows, new music showcases, local music showcases, and film reviews.

Athletics

The Cardiff University Athletic Union is the body that supports student sport at Cardiff, it oversees more than 60 competitive and non-competitive sports clubs, many of which compete in the British Universities and Colleges Sport league. The university's Ice Hockey team, the Cardiff Redhawks (which also recruits players from other Welsh universities) competes in the British Universities Ice Hockey Association leagues.

The university's sports teams also take part in the annual Welsh Varsity against Swansea University, which includes the Welsh Boat Race, and several other sporting competitions. The Welsh Varsity rugby match has been described as "probably... the second biggest Varsity Game next to Oxford vs Cambridge".

Cardiff participates in British Universities and Colleges Sport which manages a sporting framework of competitive fixtures and events for over 150 institutions around the UK. Cardiff registers nearly 100 teams in the various leagues and competitions each year and sees students travelling around the country to represent Cardiff University. In 2013 Cardiff team achieved 15th position overall across the 50 different sports hosting events.

Insignia and other representations

Motto
Cardiff University's motto is Gwirionedd, Undod a Chytgord. The Welsh motto translates as Truth, Unity and Concord or Truth, Unity and Harmony. It is taken from the prayer for the Church militant as it appears in the 1662 Book of Common Prayer.

Coat of arms

Cardiff University's current coat of arms was granted by the College of Arms in 1988 following the merger of University College Cardiff and the University of Wales Institute of Science and Technology. The coat of arms incorporates features from the heraldry of both former institutions. The three chevrons are derived from the arms of the de Clare lords of Glamorgan. The open book signifies learning; on it are the crescent and annulet, marks of cadence that indicate that University College Cardiff was the second of the University of Wales' institutions, and that the University of Wales Institute of Science and Technology was the fifth.

A notable feature of the arms are the supporters, which in heraldry are rarely granted to universities. The supporters are an angel from University College Cardiff and a Welsh Dragon from the University of Wales Institute of Science and Technology. The crest is a Welsh dragon in the stance of a lion; it stands on the helmet. Both the dragon and the helmet are distinguished by being front-facing rather than in profile as is more usually found in Welsh heraldry.

Notable alumni and academics

Heads of state and government

Lord Jenkins, former Chancellor of the Exchequer, Home Secretary, President of the European Commission and Chancellor of the University of Oxford (did not graduate)
Barham Salih, president of Iraq, former prime minister of the Iraqi Kurdistan Region and former deputy prime minister of the Iraqi federal government
Faisal Al-Fayez, Prime Minister of Jordan

Politics

David Bahati, State Minister of Finance for Planning in the Cabinet of Uganda
Jeffrey Cuthbert, Gwent Police and Crime Commissioner, MS for Caerphilly and Welsh Government Minister for Communities and Tackling Poverty
Wayne David, MP for Caerphilly and UK Shadow Minister for Europe, Shadow Minister for Defence Procurement and Shadow Minister for the Armed Forces
Elin Jones, MS for Ceredigion, Presiding Officer of the National Assembly for Wales and Welsh Government Minister for Rural Affairs
Fatou Sanyang Kinteh, Gambian Minister for Women's Affairs, Children and Social Welfare
Glenys Kinnock, MEP and UK Foreign Office Minister
Neil Kinnock, MP for Bedwellty and for Islwyn, Leader of the Labour Party, Leader of the Opposition
Hilary Marquand, MP for Cardiff East and Minister for Health.
Robert Minhinnick, co-founder of Friends of the Earth (Cymru)
Adam Price, MS and leader of Plaid Cymru
David Rees, MS for Aberavon and Deputy Presiding Officer of the Senedd Cymru.
Brian Wilson, MP for Cunninghame North and Minister of State.

Academia

Martin J. Ball, Emeritus Professor of Linguistics at Bangor University, Cymru/Wales
Paul E. A. Barbier, Professor of French at the University of Leeds
Jason Barker, professor
Yehuda Bauer, Professor of Holocaust Studies at the Avraham Harman Institute of Contemporary Jewry at the Hebrew University of Jerusalem
Leszek Borysiewicz, Vice-Chancellor of the University of Cambridge
Archie Cochrane, pioneer of scientific method in medicine
Peter Coles, Professor of Astrophysics
Martin Evans, Nobel Prize for Medicine 2007
John S. Fossey, Professor of synthetic chemistry at the University of Birmingham
Burt Goldberg, university professor, microbiologist
Robert Huber, Professor of Chemistry, Nobel Laureate in Chemistry 1988
John Loughlin, Professor of Politics
Vaughan Lowe, Chichele Professor of Public International Law in the University of Oxford
Patrick Minford, Professor of Applied Economics
John Warwick Montgomery – American lawyer and theologian; Distinguished Research Professor of Philosophy and Christian Thought at Patrick Henry College.
Keith Peters, Regius Professor of Physic in the University of Cambridge
Leighton Durham Reynolds, Emeritus Professor of Classical Languages and Literature, University of Oxford 
H. W. Lloyd Tanner, Professor of Mathematics and Astronomy (1883–1909)
Pamela Taylor, Professor of Forensic Psychiatry since 2004
Keith Ward, philosopher, Gresham Professor of Divinity, Gresham College
Chandra Wickramasinghe, mathematician, astronomer and astrobiologist, Professor of Applied Mathematics 
Rheinallt Nantlais Williams, professor of the philosophy of religion, principal of the United Theological College, Aberystwyth

Business
Spencer Dale, Chief economist, Bank of England
Andrew Gould, chairman and former CEO, Schlumberger
Dame Mary Perkins, co-founder, Specsavers
John Pettigrew (businessman), CEO, National Grid plc
Lorenzo Simonelli, CEO, Baker Hughes Company

Religion
Gregory Cameron, Bishop of St Asaph
Paul Colton, Bishop of Cork, Cloyne and Ross
Dominic Walker, Bishop of Monmouth

Sport
Nathan Cleverly, professional boxer and former WBO light heavyweight world champion
Gareth Davies, former Wales and British and Irish Lions international rugby union player, and current chief executive of Cardiff Rugby Football Club
Gerald Davies, former Wales and British and Irish Lions international rugby union player
Mike Hall, former Wales and British and Irish Lions international rugby union player
Heather Knight, English cricketer
Steven Outerbridge, Bermudian cricketer
Jamie Roberts, Wales and British and Irish Lions international rugby union player
James Tomlinson, English cricketer
Bradley Wadlan, Welsh cricketer
Alex Gough, Squash player

Arts and journalism

Paul Atherton, television and film producer and director
Matt Barbet, journalist
Manish Bhasin, journalist and television presenter
Nick Broomfield, documentary filmmaker and receiver of the BAFTA Lifetime Achievement Award for Contribution to Documentary
Philip Cashian, composer
Suw Charman-Anderson, journalist and social software consultant.
Adrian Chiles, television presenter
Gillian Clarke, poet and receiver of the Queen's Gold Medal for Poetry
Huw Edwards, journalist
Ken Elias, artist/painter
Brian J. Ford, author, editor, columnist. Television host, commentator, personality. Radio presenter and contributor. 
Max Foster, CNN anchor, CNN Today
M. A. Griffiths, poet
Julia Hartley-Brewer, journalist and television presenter
Jiang Heping, executive director of the CCTV Sports Programming Centre and Controller of CCTV-5
Tim Hetherington, photo-journalist and co-director of Academy Award-nominated Restrepo
Elis James, stand-up comedian and actor
Alun Hoddinott, composer
Sioned James (1974-2016), choral conductor
Karl Jenkins, composer
Alan Johnston, journalist
Riz Khan, journalist and television interviewer
Bernard Knight, crime writer
Simon Lane, co-founder and Creative director of The Yogscast Ltd
Gwilym Lee, actor.
Siân Lloyd, television presenter
Los Campesinos!, six piece indie pop band
Philip Madoc, actor
Paul Moorcraft, writer
Sharon Morgan, actress
Joanna Natasegara, documentary producer, Academy Award winner for Netflix documentary The White Helmets
Siân Phillips, actress
Susanna Reid, television presenter
James Righton, musician
Leo Rowlands, Welsh musical composer, Catholic priest
Arlene Sierra, composer
Mari Strachan, novelist and librarian
Richard Tait, former BBC governor and BBC trustee
Craig Thomas, author
Alex Thomson, journalist & television presenter
Vedhicka, Indian actress
Grace Williams, composer
Ron Smerczak actor

Workload controversy
On 19 February 2018, Malcolm Anderson, a university lecturer committed suicide by jumping off a university building and died at age 48. The inquiry determined that Anderson's suicide was the result of a high-pressure workload.

In 2020, Grace Krause, a PhD student employed at Cardiff University started experiencing headaches and back pain after lengthy work at a computer. She tweeted that "Staff are marking hundreds of essays in an impossibly short time. It is exhausting. Everyone is in crisis mode. Stressed, moody, morose, everyone feels like they’re drowning." Soon after, an email from the university was sent to all PhD students asking for these comments to be deleted, in order to avoid negative media attention. This has since sparked a debate about freedom of speech between employers and employees.

See also

Armorial of UK universities
College of advanced technology (United Kingdom)
Education in Wales
List of universities in Wales
List of modern universities in Europe (1801–1945)
List of UK universities
Town and gown

References

External links

 
Cathays
Dental schools in Wales
Education in Cardiff
Educational institutions established in 1883
Organisations based in Wales with royal patronage
Russell Group
Universities UK
1883 establishments in Wales